Outside the Bubble: A Roadtrip with Alexandra Pelosi is Alexandra Pelosi's 12th HBO Documentary with Sheila Nevins as executive producer and Lisa Heller as senior producer. 

Alexandra Pelosi said after making the film, "If you made me, I could literally come up with a [list of] Tea Party people who have invited me to spend the night in their home across America."

References

External links

2018 television films
2010s political films
2018 documentary films
2018 films
American documentary television films
2010s English-language films
2010s American films